The Bełchatów coal mine is a large open-pit mine in the centre of Poland in Bełchatów, Łódź Voivodeship, 150 km west of the capital, Warsaw. Bełchatów represents one of the largest coal reserve in Poland having estimated reserves of 1,930 million tonnes of lignite coal. In 2015, the mine produced 42.1 million tonnes of lignite (66.7% of Poland's total lignite production) to feed Bełchatów Power Station.

References

External links 
 Official site

Buildings and structures in Łódź Voivodeship
Coal mines in Poland
Open-pit mines